Pimeloyl chloride is a di-acyl chloride. It is used as a reagent in organic synthesis.

Synthesis
Pimeloyl chloride can be synthesized from pimelic acid in thionyl chloride.

References

Acyl chlorides